Rodney Murdoch was a British figure skater who competed in pair skating.

With partner Mollie Phillips, he won bronze at the 1933 European Figure Skating Championships in London.

Competitive highlights 
With  Mollie Phillips

References 

British male pair skaters
Date of birth missing
Date of death missing